Feeling from Mountain and Water (Chinese: 山水情; Pinyin: shān shuǐ qíng) is a Chinese animated short film produced by Shanghai Animation Film Studio under the master animator Te Wei.  It is also referred to as Love of Mountain and River and Feelings of Mountains and Waters.

Background
The film does not contain any dialogue, allowing it to be watched by any culture.   The only noises are the sound of the wind or other earthly elements.  The film is considered a masterpiece at the artistic level, since it was essentially a landscape painting in motion.  Artistically, it uses a Shan shui painting style throughout.

Story
The story is about an impoverished elderly scholar and a young boy who cares for him briefly in return for guqin lessons.

Awards
 Won the Best animated film prize at the Golden Rooster Awards in 1989.

References

External links
 
 The film at China's Movie Database
 Website showing the film

1988 films
1980s animated short films
Chinese animated short films
Animated films without speech
Films directed by Te Wei
1988 animated films
Chinese animation